Mountain States League may refer to one of the following professional baseball leagues in the United States:

Mountain States League (1911–12), which operated in Kentucky, Ohio, and West Virginia
Mountain States League (1948–54), which operated in Kentucky and Tennessee

See also
Mountain State League, which operated from 1937 to 1942 in West Virginia